Aquismón is a town and municipality in San Luis Potosí in central Mexico. The town had a population of 2,127.

References

 

Municipalities of San Luis Potosí